The Port of Yeosu is a port in South Korea, located in the city of Yeosu, South Jeolla Province.

References

Yeosu